This page shows the progress of Exeter City F.C. in the 2014–15 football season. They are playing in the fourth tier of English football, League Two.

Match details

Pre-season

League Two

League table

Matches
The fixtures for the 2014–15 season were announced on 18 June 2014 at 9am.

FA Cup

The draw for the first round of the FA Cup was made on 27 October 2014.

League Cup

The draw for the first round was made on 17 June 2014 at 10am. Exeter City were drawn at home to Bournemouth.

Football League Trophy

Transfers

References

Exeter City F.C. seasons
Exeter City